The 1967 Hamilton Tiger-Cats season was the 10th season for the team in the Canadian Football League and their 18th overall. The Tiger-Cats finished in 1st place in the Eastern Conference with a 10–4 record and won the Grey Cup over the Saskatchewan Roughriders.

Preseason

Regular season

Season Standings

Season schedule

Playoffs

Schedule

Grey Cup

References

Hamilton Tiger-cats Season, 1967
Hamilton Tiger-Cats seasons
James S. Dixon Trophy championship seasons
Grey Cup championship seasons